is a Japanese multimedia franchise. Originating as a concept book released in November 2017, it later received a novel series written by Hiroyuki Nakao and illustrated by Eisaku Kubonouchi. An anime television series for the franchise by NUT is set to air in 2023.

Characters

Media

Print

A series of novels, written by Hiroyuki Nakao and illustrated by Eisaku Kubonouchi, began publication on December 27, 2018. As of September 2019, two volumes have been released.

Volume list

Anime
An anime television series for the franchise was announced on November 18, 2022. It is set to be written and directed by Hiroyasu Aoki and produced by NUT, with Takahisa Katagiri adapting Kubonouchi's original designs for animation, and Junji Okubo as mechanical designer. It is set to premiere in 2023.

References

External links
  
 

2018 Japanese novels
2023 anime television series debuts
Mass media franchises
Mecha anime and manga
NUT (studio)
Upcoming anime television series